The discography of I See Stars, an American electronicore band formed in Warren, Michigan, in 2006 consists of five studio albums, three remix albums, two extended plays, and numerous singles and videos. The quartet consists of vocalist Devin Oliver, vocalist and keyboardist Andrew Oliver, lead guitarist Brent Allen, and bassist Jeff Valentine. Chris Moore replaced Johnson in the period of 2009–2010; however, Johnson was later reunited with the band in 2010. However, Johnson left the band once again in 2015, followed shortly after by Gregerson.

The band self-released two extended plays, before signing to Sumerian Records in 2008. Ever since, the band went on to release five studio albums, 3-D (2009), The End of the World Party (2011), Digital Renegade (2012), and New Demons (2013), and Treehouse (2016).

Albums

Studio albums

Remix albums

Extended plays

Singles

Music videos

Collaborations

External links

I See Stars discography at AllMusic

References

Discographies of American artists